The final of the Women's 50 metres Freestyle event at the European LC Championships 1997 was held on Sunday 24 August 1997 in Seville, Spain.

Finals

Qualifying heats

See also
1996 Women's Olympic Games 50m Freestyle
1997 Women's World Championships (SC) 50m Freestyle

References
 scmsom results
 swimrankings
La Gazzetta Archivio

F